Disney's ABCD 2, also known as Any Body Can Dance 2, is a 2015 Indian Hindi-language dance film directed and choreographed by Remo D'Souza and produced by Siddharth Roy Kapur under Walt Disney Pictures. A stand-alone sequel to the 2013 film ABCD: Any Body Can Dance, the film stars Prabhu Deva, Varun Dhawan and Shraddha Kapoor in the lead roles alongside Sushant Pujari, and is partially inspired by the life account of Suresh Mukund and Vernon Monteiro, played respectively by Dhawan and Pujari, founders of the "fictitious dance crew" The Kings, who went on to win the World Hip Hop Dance Championship in San Diego.

ABCD 2 was released by UTV Motion Pictures on 19 June 2015 in 3D, and was one of Disney's only two original musical films in the Indian market, with Sachin–Jigar composing the soundtrack and background score, while Mayur Puri wrote the dialogues and lyrics. The decommissioned warship  was featured as a backdrop behind the dancers' practice area during the first half of the film. D'Souza and Tushar Hiranandani wrote the screenplay.

ABCD 2 earned mixed to positive reviews, with praise for its production design, choreography, music and the performances of Deva, Dhawan and Kapoor, while criticism was aimed at its writing and length.

Plot 
Suresh 'Suru' Mukund, a waiter in a bar, wants to be a big dancer to fulfill his late mother Durgadevi's wish, for which he is supported by his best friend Vernon Monteiro, a pizza delivery boy. Vinita "Vinnie" Sharma, a hairdresser, wants to be the best hip-hop dancer. Childhood friends from suburban Nalasopara, Mumbai, they form a team and participate in a national-level competition Hum Kisi Se Kum Nahin where they are disqualified from the grand finale as their moves are revealed to be copied from the performance act of the Philippine All Stars and the judges term them "cheaters". Everyone departs to search for jobs. Suru returns to work as a waiter, Vinnie rejoins a beauty parlor and Vernon gets back as a delivery boy where, on and off, they are insulted as cheaters. The departure of angry teammates adds injury to insult, and nothing is set to be corrected.

Suru hopes to remove the negative tag by planning to win a grander hip-hop competition in Las Vegas, the World Dance Championship, where the Philippine All Stars are highly popular. One day he watches Vishnu, a rogue visitor, prove his dance mettle to a betting visitor in the bar and convinces him repeatedly to be their choreographer. They audition for people and formulate the team. During the practices for the qualifiers, Vinod, a deaf-mute dancer, discovers Vinnie and Suru's hidden love for each other. They visit the qualifiers in Bangalore, where they are pre-insulted as cheaters, but manage to win it after Vishnu begs the audience for one last chance for the team. Although things are fine, Suru is broken when Shetty Anna, the owner of the bar where he is employed, refuses to provide him financial support extending to Rs. 25 lakhs, something he had earlier publicly promised to Suru at the time of the Hum Kisi Se Kum Nahin finale, and Suru leaves the place, angry at Anna's insulting language for Vinnie. However, Vishnu manages to get the money from Crocxz's uncle who he convinces after Suru loses hope when Vishnu gets angry at his inability to arrange team funds. Later they prepare to go to Las Vegas, but Vinod learns from Vishnu himself that the latter has ulterior motives to go to Vegas, and, as a matter of fact, he had deliberately impressed Suru and friends to procure a way out for his plan. After reaching Las Vegas, they win the qualifiers. Later, Vishnu leaves the hotel with team money to meet his son Manu, whose mother Swati, Vishnu's ex-wife, is married to another man and has moved on in life. His son Manu recognizes him, his art, and his achievements, and Vishnu leaves with a contented heart.

Meanwhile, Vinnie is injured due to excessive rehearsal and is replaced by Olive, an American girl of partial Indian origin, and Vishnu discovers this while thanking friend Gopi, who works in a bar-cum-hotel. At the same time, Suru is enraged when he finds Vishnu missing and tries to proceed with jam sessions all on his own, but in vain. Vishnu returns while trying to save the day for Suru from the German team as they get into a fight, later admitting he had made a 'mistake' leaving without permission although he didn't want to lose a family he had yearned to create in years; he apologizes, is forgiven by Suru, and the team enters the finals. Across rehearsals, Olive gets close to Suru, and a jealous Vinnie finally confronts Suru, who initially finds it difficult to confess his love for her as they had been best friends from childhood, but eventually gets together with her. Although Olive has feelings for Suru, an in-person conversation with Vinnie assures Olive that Suru had that inherent charm with nothing to do about his sweetness, and Olive agrees to continue with the Indian Stunners after Vinnie recovers. The team enters the final, where Vinod's health worsens during an "assemblage" by the team, and the formation suddenly breaks down even as his friend D, who knew about his tuberculosis problem, tries to support him. Everyone has almost given up after the accident when Vinod tries to encourage Suru, who forgoes the accident and the others return to make the formation with success with Vinod at the bottom. Although unable to win the competition, they win the hearts of millions, with Suru lending a voiceover narrative about his mother's motivational lessons on dance.

Cast 
 
Prabhu Deva as Vishnu
Varun Dhawan as Suresh "Suru" Mukund
Shraddha Kapoor as Vinita "Vinnie" Sharma
Sushant Pujari as Vernon Monteiro
Lauren Gottlieb as Olive
Raghav Juyal as Raghav "Crocxz" 
Dharmesh Yelande as Dharmesh a.k.a. "D" 
Punit Pathak as Vinod
Tisca Chopra as Swati Kashyap, Vishnu's ex-wife
Murali Sharma as Shetty Anna
Pavan Rao as Pavan
Dipak Salve as Dipak
Sandip Sable as Sandi
Shushant Khatri as Chotu
Nikhil Kasare as Nikhil
Prachi Shah as Padmashree Durga Devi, Suru's deceased mother
Alina Kumar as Mayuri
Sumeet Pendam as Sumeet
Jineet Rath as Manav 'Manu' Kashyap, Vishnu's son
Pooja Batra in a special appearance as Pooja Kohli
Shashank Khaitan in a friendly appearance as a local judge in the Bengaluru qualifiers
Kapil Sharma as himself
Navjot Singh Sidhu as himself

Filming
ABCD 2 was shot in Mumbai, Bangalore and Las Vegas. the shooting was finally over in March 2015. The young-talented French duo Les Twins (Laurent and Larry Bourgeois) were also roped in for a special freestyle dance in the song "Tattoo". Kapoor is known to have celebrated her 26th birthday on the sets of the film with a Disney princess cake.

Release 

ABCD 2 was released by UTV Motion Pictures, a Disney subsidiary, on 19 June 2015. However, D'Souza wanted to pre-release it on 18 June 2015 due to the beginning of the Muslim holy month of Ramadan. He stated, We just come to know that the Holy month of Ramadan starts on 19 June, the day we have scheduled the release of ABCD 2. I've been receiving so many emails and messages from my Muslim friends requesting not to release on that day, as they would be unable to go for the film.

Critical reception 

On the review aggregation website Rotten Tomatoes, the film has a rating of 58%, based on 12 reviews, with an average rating of 6/10. Anupama Chopra gave 2.5 out of 5 stars and said "Taking a cue from Hollywood's Step Up series, director-choreographer Remo D'Souza packs in a television dance competition, several elaborate dance sequences, a romantic rivalry and the requisite rich-poor divide."

Meena Iyre from The Times of India gave it 3 out of 5 stars stating the film raises the bar from its first part. Sukanya Verma of Rediff liked the choreography but thought that "because of its poorly paced beginning, ABCD 2 feels a bit of stretch at 154 minutes." She gave the film 2.5 out of 5 stars. Rajeev Masand of CNN-IBN also gave the film 2.5 out of 5 stars writing that the film "makes up for its amateurish storytelling with its often jaw-dropping set pieces and the sheer hard work of its leads. Varun and Shraddha are so earnest, you're willing to forgive their less-than-convincing histrionics because their dancing – particularly Varun's – is mighty impressive. Both actors hold their own against the professionals without losing face."

The film got a negative review from Shubhra Gupta of The Indian Express who gave it 1.5 out of 5 stars. She wrote "A dance movie needs to electrify. That's missing in this Shraddha Kapoor, Varun Dhawan starrer".

Soundtrack 

Distributed and released by Zee Music Company as part of its 2-year contract with Disney, the soundtrack and background score of ABCD 2 is composed entirely by Sachin Sanghvi and Jigar Saraiya under the Sachin–Jigar alias, while the lyrics were written by Mayur Puri, with Badshah, Rimi Nique and D. Soldierz providing additional lyrics, while Priya Saraiya guest-wrote and sang the song "Sun Saathiya", a scratch version of which was featured in ABCD: Any Body Can Dance. The audio album was released on 22 May 2015.

A reprised, uncredited version of "Vande Mataram" appears during the end credits. The version is crooned by Sachin and Jigar.

A reprise version of "Bezubaan Phir Se" was also released, crooned by Shraddha Kapoor and Neel Sharma, with the English rap written by Sharma and the Hindi lyrics borrowed from Puri.

Awards and nominations

References

External links 
 
 

2015 films
2010s Hindi-language films
Indian musical films
Indian dance films
Indian 3D films
UTV Motion Pictures films
2015 3D films
Hindi-language films based on actual events
Disney India films
Indian films based on actual events
Films about dance competitions
Hindi-language drama films
Films directed by Remo D'Souza